Elena Rybkina (born 24 April 1964) is a Russian badminton player. 

Rybkina competed in women's singles at the 1992 Summer Olympics in Barcelona, and in women's singles and women's doubles at the 1996 Summer Olympics in Atlanta.

References

External links

1964 births
Living people
Russian female badminton players
Olympic badminton players of Russia
Olympic badminton players of the Unified Team
Badminton players at the 1992 Summer Olympics
Badminton players at the 1996 Summer Olympics